The Plumb-pudding in danger, or, State Epicures taking un Petit Souper is an 1805 editorial cartoon by the English artist James Gillray.  The popular print depicts caricatures of the British Prime Minister William Pitt the Younger and the newly-crowned Emperor of France Napoleon, both wearing military uniforms, carving up a terrestrial globe into spheres of influence.  It was published as a hand-coloured print and has been described by the National Portrait Gallery as "probably Gillray's most famous print" and by the British Library as "one of Gillray’s most famous satires dealing with the Napoleonic wars".

Background
Gillray's print is a satire on the overtures made by Napoleon in January 1805 for a reconciliation with Britain during the War of the Third Coalition.  The short-lived Peace of Amiens, a treaty between Britain and France, had ended in 1803, and Napoleon was threatening to invade Britain with his Grande Armée based at Boulogne.  

The peace overtures came to naught: before the end of the year, a combined Franco-Spanish fleet would be decisively defeated by the Royal Navy at the Battle of Trafalgar, giving Britain unrivalled control of the seas, but Napoleon would establish a dominant position in Europe by first defeating an Austrian army through manoeuvre in the Ulm Campaign, and then winning a great victory over a combined Russian-Austrian army at the Battle of Austerlitz, ending the Third Coalition with the 1805 Peace of Pressburg.

Description
Pitt and Napoleon are seated on opposite sides of a dining table, each using a carving knife and carving fork to cut pieces from a large spherical plum pudding bearing a map of the world, with the British Isles at the centre between them.  The scene is replete with iconography referring to the contemporary political situation the Napoleonic Wars.
 
Pitt, sitting to the left, is depicted tall and emaciated.  He wears a red regimental uniform of the British Army – perhaps the Cinque Port Volunteer Corps that he had raised in Kent – with powdered hair in a queue, and a cocked tricorn hat.  His fork resembles a three-pronged trident, referring to Britain's naval might, and he is carving a slice of sea to the west of the British Isles marked "ocean" and "West Indies".  

Napoleon, to the right, the "little corporal", is much smaller in height and stockier in build, with a prominent hooked nose.  He wears the blue coat of the Imperial French Army, and his large fore-and-aft bicorn hat has an extravagant feather plume reminiscent of a French cock.  His large knife resembles a military sword, and his two-pronged fork is embedded over a region marked "Hanover", home of the ruling British monarchs of the House of Hanover.  He is cutting away a slice of land to the east of the British Isles marked "Europe", but his piece of land is much smaller than Pitt's portion of sea.  

The pudding rests on a large gold platter at the centre of the table, which is covered by a white tablecloth.  Pitt and Napoleon each have a smaller gold plate ready for their slices, Pitt's bearing the British Royal Coat of Arms and Napoleon's an imperial crown.  The back of Pitt's chair is decorated with the image of lion carrying a cross of St George (sometimes a Union Flag) and Napoleon's has an Imperial eagle clutching a bonnet rouge.  

The print includes at top left the title "The Plumb-pudding in danger; - or - State Epicures taking un Petit Souper" the latter half in French, meaning 'state gourmets taking a little supper' – "Epicures" refers to the Greek hedonist philosopher Epicurus. Below this is a quotation attributed to William Windham in the Political Register newspaper, but actually taken from Shakespeare's The Tempest, Act 4, Scene 1, lines 153-4:

"The great Globe itself and all which it inherit", is too small to satisfy such insatiable appetites.
                                                         - - Vide Mr W-d-m's eccentricities, in ye Political Register.

An inscription also records that the print was designed and made by James Gillray, but it was not numbered or signed.

Reception
The print was published by Hannah Humphrey, of 27 St James's Street in London, on 26 February 1805, and was originally sold for about five shillings.  There are examples in many museum and private collections.  It has been described by Martin Rowson as "probably the most famous political cartoon of all time … stolen over and over and over again by cartoonists ever since".

References

 The plumb-pudding in danger: - or - state epicures taking un petit souper, National Portrait Gallery
 The Plumb-pudding in danger – or – State Epicures taking un Petit Souper by Gillray, British Library
 The Plumb-Pudding in Danger, Waterloo2000.org
 Cartoonist who made all the prints unfit for news, The Telegraph, 24 June 2000
 The Plumb-Pudding in Danger;–or–State Epicures Taking un Petit Souper, Metropolitan Museum of Art
 The plumb-pudding in danger: -or- state epicures taking un petit souper, British Museum
 The Plumb-pudding in danger, or, State epicures taking un petit souper ..., Library of Congress
 The Plum-Pudding in Danger, Victoria and Albert Museum
 Napoleon and Empire, FutureLearn
 The Plum-Pudding in Danger, The Map House

1805 prints
Individual printed cartoons
British political satire
Caricature
Satirical works
Works about the Napoleonic Wars
Cultural depictions of William Pitt the Younger
Cultural depictions of Napoleon